Elections were held on November 2, 2010 to determine North Carolina's 13 members of the United States House of Representatives. Representatives were elected for two-year-terms to serve in the 112th United States Congress from January 3, 2011 until January 3, 2013. Primary elections were held on May 4, 2010 and primary runoff elections were held on June 22, 2010.

Of the 13 elections, the races in the 2nd, 8th and 11th districts were rated as competitive by Sabato's Crystal Ball, while the 2nd, 7th, 8th and 11th districts were rated as competitive by CQ Politics and The Rothenberg Political Report, and the 2nd, 4th, 7th, 8th and 11th districts were rated as competitive by The Cook Political Report. Of North Carolina's 13 incumbents, 12 were re-elected while one (Bob Etheridge of the 2nd district) unsuccessfully sought re-election.

In total, seven Democrats and six Republicans were elected. A total of 2,662,529 votes were cast, of which 1,440,913 (54.12 percent) were for Republican candidates, 1,204,635 (45.24 percent) were for Democratic candidates, 16,562 (0.62 percent) were for Libertarian candidates and 439 (0.02 percent) were for write-in candidates. As of 2021, this is the last time that Democrats won a majority of North Carolina's congressional districts.

Overview
Results of the 2010 United States House of Representatives elections in North Carolina by district:

District 1 

The 1st district included parts of Goldsboro, Greenville, Rocky Mount and Wilson. The district's population was 50 percent black and 44 percent white (see Race and ethnicity in the United States Census); 76 percent were high school graduates and 13 percent had received a bachelor's degree or higher. Its median income was $32,216. In the 2008 presidential election the district gave 63 percent of its vote to Democratic nominee Barack Obama and 37 percent to Republican nominee John McCain.

Democrat G. K. Butterfield, who took office in 2004, was the incumbent. Butterfield was re-elected in 2008 with 70 percent of the vote. In 2010 Butterfield's opponent in the general election was Republican nominee Ashley Woolard, an insurance executive. Chad Larkins, a contractor, also sought the Democratic nomination. John Carter, a U.S. Air Force veteran; Jerry Grimes, an assistant pastor and ethics instructor; and James Gordon Miller also sought the Republican nomination.

Butterfield raised $828,117 and spent $794,383. Woolard raised $133,394 and spent $133,387. Larkins raised $450 and spent no money. Grimes raised $11,747 and spent $10,752.

Prior to the election FiveThirtyEights forecast gave Butterfield a 100 percent chance of winning and projected that he would receive 63 percent of the vote to Woolard's 35 percent. On election day Butterfield was re-elected with 59 percent of the vote to Woolard's 41 percent. Butterfield was again re-elected in 2012 and 2014.

 Democratic primary results 

 Republican primary results 

 General election results 

 External links 
 
 
 
 
 

 District 2 

The 2nd district included Sanford and parts of Fayetteville and Raleigh. The district's population was 58 percent white, 29 percent black and 11 percent Hispanic (see Race and ethnicity in the United States Census); 80 percent were high school graduates and 18 percent had received a bachelor's degree or higher. Its median income was $42,945. In the 2008 presidential election the district gave 52 percent of its vote to Democratic nominee Barack Obama and 47 percent to Republican nominee John McCain. In 2010 the district had a Cook Partisan Voting Index of R+2.

Democrat Bob Etheridge, who took office in 1997, was the incumbent. Etheridge was re-elected in 2008 with 67 percent of the vote. In 2010 Etheridge's opponent in the general election was Republican nominee Renee Ellmers, a nurse. Libertarian Party nominee Tom Rose also ran. Etheridge was unopposed in the Democratic primary. Frank Deatrich, a retired businessman; and Todd Gailas, an auto dealer, also sought the Republican nomination.

In June 2010 Etheridge was involved in an incident in which he grabbed a camera belonging to a pair of self-described students, one of whose wrists he then grabbed, before placing the student in a hug. One of the students had asked whether Etheridge supported "the Obama agenda", to which Etheridge replied "who are you?" The incident went viral on the internet and cable television, and led to a spike in financial contributions to Ellmers's campaign. Etheridge later issued an apology for grabbing the young man.

Etheridge raised $1,414,630 and spent $1,904,688. Ellmers raised $1,118,736 and spent $886,608. Gailas raised $2,140 and spent $959.

In a poll of 400 registered voters, conducted by SurveyUSA (SUSA) for the Civitas Institute (CI) in June 2010, Ellmers led with 39 percent to Etheridge's 38 percent, while 12 percent supported Rose and 11 percent were undecided. A poll of 400 registered voters, conducted by SUSA for CI in October 2010, found Ellmers leading with 46 percent to Etheridge's 41 percent while Rose had the support of 6 percent and 7 percent were undecided.

Sabato's Crystal Ball rated the race as "likely Democrat", citing Etheridge's fundraising advantage over Ellmers. In October 2010 The Cook Political Report rated the race as "lean Democratic" and CQ Politics rated the race as "likely Democratic". In November 2010 The Rothenberg Political Report rated the race as "Toss-up/Tilt Democrat". Prior to the election FiveThirtyEight's forecast gave Ellmers a 55 percent chance of winning and projected that she would receive 47 percent of the vote to Etheridge's 46 percent, while Rose would receive 6 percent.

On election day Ellmers was elected with 50 percent of the vote to Etheridge's 49 percent, while Rose received 2 percent. On November 4, 2010, Etheridge had yet to concede despite the Associated Press declaring Ellmers the winner. On November 12 Etheridge confirmed he would seek a recount, after which he conceded on November 19. Ellmers was again re-elected in 2012 and 2014. Etheridge unsuccessfully ran for Governor of North Carolina in 2012. In 2013 Etheridge was appointed to lead North Carolina's Farm Service Agency.

 Republican primary results 

 General election results 

 External links 
 
 
 

 District 3 

The 3rd district included Jacksonville and parts of Greenville and Wilson. The district's population was 75 percent white, 17 percent black and 6 percent Hispanic (see Race and ethnicity in the United States Census); 86 percent were high school graduates and 23 percent had received a bachelor's degree or higher. Its median income was $46,958. In the 2008 presidential election the district gave 61 percent of its vote to Republican nominee John McCain and 38 percent to Democratic nominee Barack Obama.

Republican Walter B. Jones, Jr., who took office in 1995, was the incumbent. Jones was re-elected in 2008 with 66 percent of the vote. In 2010 Jones's opponent in the general election was Democratic nominee Johnny Rouse, an employee of The Brody School of Medicine at East Carolina University. Libertarian Party nominee Darryl Holloman, a software developer, also ran. Robert Cavanaugh and Craig Weber, the latter of whom challenged Jones as a Democrat in 2006 and 2008, also sought the Republican nomination. Rouse was unopposed for the Democratic nomination.

Jones raised $672,357 and spent $577,215. Rouse raised $10,588 and spent $11,071. Holloman raised $355 and spent $238. Weber raised $2,181 and spent the same amount.

Prior to the election FiveThirtyEight's forecast gave Jones a 100 percent chance of winning and projected that he would receive 70 percent of the vote to Rouse's 28 percent. On election day Jones was re-elected with 72 percent of the vote to Rouse's 26 percent. Jones was again re-elected in 2012 and 2014.

 Republican primary results 

 General election results 

 External links 
 
 
 

 District 4 

The 4th district included Chapel Hill, Durham, and parts of Cary and Raleigh. The district's population was 66 percent white, 19 percent black, 8 percent Hispanic and 6 percent Asian (see Race and ethnicity in the United States Census); 91 percent were high school graduates and 52 percent had received a bachelor's degree or higher. Its median income was $65,138. In the 2008 presidential election the district gave 62 percent of its vote to Democratic nominee Barack Obama and 37 percent to Republican nominee John McCain. In 2010 the district had a Cook Partisan Voting Index of D+8.

Democrat David Price, who took office in 1997 and previously served from 1987 to 1995, was the incumbent. Price was re-elected in 2008 with 63 percent of the vote. In 2010 Price's opponent in the general election was Republican nominee B.J. Lawson, who also ran in 2008. Price was unopposed for the Democratic nomination. David Burnett, the owner of a roofing company; George Hutchins, a Gulf War veteran; and Frank Roche, a former Wall Street executive, also sought the Republican nomination.

Price raised $994,557 and spent $1,335,750. Lawson raised $472,914 and spent $474,716. Burnett raised $12,783 and spent $12,540. Hutchins raised $8,942 and spent $18,944. Roche raised $94,711 and spent the same amount.

In a poll of 1,038 likely voters, conducted by Action Solutions for Lawson's campaign in August 2010, Lawson led with 46.5 percent of the vote to Price's 46.1 percent. In October 2010 The Cook Political Report rated the race as "likely Democratic". Prior to the election FiveThirtyEight's forecast gave Price a 99 percent chance of winning and projected that he would receive 59 percent of the vote to Lawson's 41 percent. On election day Price was re-elected with 57 percent of the vote to Lawson's 43 percent. Price was again re-elected in 2012 and 2014.

 Republican primary results 

 General election results 

 External links 
 
 
 
 

 District 5 

The 5th district included parts of Kernersville, Statesville and Winston-Salem. The district's population was 85 percent white, 7 percent black and 6 percent Hispanic (see Race and ethnicity in the United States); 81 percent were high school graduates and 22 percent had received a bachelor's degree or higher. Its median income was $45,133. In the 2008 presidential election the district gave 61 percent of its vote to Republican nominee John McCain and 38 percent to Democratic nominee Barack Obama.

Republican Virginia Foxx, who took office in 2005, was the incumbent. Foxx was re-elected in 2008 with 58 percent of the vote. In 2010 Foxx's opponent in the general election was Democratic nominee Billy Kennedy, a radio host. Keith Gardner, the owner of a medical-practice management business, also sought the Republican nomination. Kennedy was unopposed for the Democratic nomination.

Foxx raised $853,579 and spent $575,301. Kennedy raised $332,361 and spent $322,140. Prior to the election FiveThirtyEight's forecast gave Foxx a 100 percent chance of winning and projected that she would receive 64 percent of the vote to Kennedy's 34 percent. On election day Foxx was re-elected with 66 percent of the vote to Kennedy's 34 percent. Foxx was again re-elected in 2012 and 2014.

 Republican primary results 

 General election results 

 External links 
 
 

 District 6 

The 6th district included Asheboro and parts of Burlington, Greensboro, High Point and Thomasville. The district's population was 81 percent white, 9 percent black and 6 percent Hispanic (see Race and ethnicity in the United States Census); 83 percent were high school graduates and 25 percent had received a bachelor's degree or higher. Its median income was $50,721. In the 2008 presidential election the district gave 63 percent of its vote to Republican nominee John McCain and 36 percent to Democratic nominee Barack Obama.

Republican Howard Coble, who took office in 1985, was the incumbent. Coble was re-elected in 2008 with 67 percent of the vote. In 2010 Coble's opponent in the general election was Democratic nominee Sam Turner, a United Airlines pilot. Cathy Brewer Hinson, the manager of a furniture showroom building; Jon Mangin, the owner of IT Trainer Consultant and Viae Training and Consult; Jeff Phillips, a financial advisor; James Taylor, a doctor; and Billy Yow, a Guilford County commissioner, also sought the Republican nomination. Turner was unopposed in the Democratic primary.

Coble raised $503,434 and spent $925,991. Turner raised $3,775 and spent $3,722. Mangin raised $5,250 and spent $5,218. Phillips raised $8,648 and spent $9,019. Taylor raised $122,990 and spent $120,110. Yow raised $64,471 and spent $64,370.

Prior to the election FiveThirtyEights forecast gave Coble a 100 percent chance of winning and projected that he would receive 71 percent of the vote to Turner's 27 percent. On election day Coble was re-elected with 75 percent of the vote to Turner's 25 percent. Coble was again re-elected in 2012 and retired rather than seeking re-election in 2014. He was succeeded by fellow Republican Mark Walker.

 Republican primary results 

General election results

 
 
 
 

External links
 
 
 
 
 

District 7

The 7th district included Lumberton, Wilmington and part of Fayetteville. The district's population was 64 percent white, 21 percent black, 7 percent Native American and 6 percent Hispanic (see Race and ethnicity in the United States Census); 80 percent were high school graduates and 21 percent had received a bachelor's degree or higher. Its median income was $41,693. In the 2008 presidential election the district gave 52 percent of its vote to Republican nominee John McCain and 47 percent to Democratic nominee Barack Obama. In 2010 the district had a Cook Partisan Voting Index of R+5.

Democrat Mike McIntyre, who took office in 1997, was the incumbent. McIntyre was re-elected in 2008 with 69 percent of the vote. In 2010 McIntyre's opponent in the general election was Republican nominee Ilario Pantano, a former U.S. Marine who killed two unarmed Iraqi prisoners in 2004. McIntyre was unopposed in the Democratic primary. Will Breazeale, an airline pilot who was the Republican nominee in the 7th district in 2008, and Randy Crow also sought the Republican nomination.

McIntyre raised $1,320,793 and spent $1,886,262. Pantano raised $1,234,943 and spent $1,224,496. Breazeale raised $53,034 and spent $52,402.

In a poll of 400 likely voters, conducted on August 31 and September 2, 2010 by Public Opinion Strategies, Pantano led with 48 percent to McIntyre's 41 percent. A poll of 450 registered voters, conducted by SurveyUSA for the Civitas Institute in September 2010, found 46 percent intended to vote for Pantano while 45 percent supported McIntyre. In a poll of 400 likely voters, conducted by Grove Insight in October 2010 for the Democratic Congressional Campaign Committee, McIntyre led with 52 percent to Pantano's 41 percent.

In October 2010 The Cook Political Report rated the race as "lean Democratic" and CQ Politics rated the race as "leans Democratic". In November 2010 The Rothenberg Political Report rated the race as "Toss-up/Tilt Democrat". Prior to the election FiveThirtyEights forecast gave McIntyre a 51 percent chance of winning and projected that he would receive 50.1 percent of the vote to Pantano's 49.9 percent.

On election day McIntyre was re-elected with 54 percent of the vote to Pantano's 46 percent. McIntyre was again re-elected in 2012 and retired rather than seeking re-election in 2014. He was succeeded by Republican David Rouzer. Pantano unsuccessfully sought the Republican nomination in the 7th district in 2012 and in 2013 became the director of the North Carolina State Division of Veterans Affairs. Breazeale unsuccessfully ran for South Carolina Adjutant General in 2014.

Republican primary results

General election results

External links
 
 

 District 8 

The 8th district included parts of Charlotte, Concord and Fayetteville. The district's population was 58 percent white, 28 percent black and 9 percent Hispanic (see Race and ethnicity in the United States Census); 82 percent were high school graduates and 20 percent had received a bachelor's degree or higher. Its median income was $43,227. In the 2008 presidential election the district gave 52 percent of its vote to Democratic nominee Barack Obama and 47 percent to Republican nominee John McCain. In 2010 the district had a Cook Partisan Voting Index of R+2.

Democrat Larry Kissell, who took office in 2009, was the incumbent. Kissell was elected in 2008 with 55 percent of the vote. In 2010 Kissell's opponent in the general election was Republican nominee Harold Johnson, a sportscaster. Libertarian Party nominee Thomas Hill also ran. Nancy Shakir, a retired teacher, also sought the Democratic nomination. Lee Cornelison, an accountant and Vietnam veteran; Tim D'Annunzio, a business owner and former paratrooper; Darrell Day, a preacher; Lou Huddleston, an army officer; and Hal Jordan, a computer programmer, also sought the Republican nomination. Wendell Fant, a former member of Kissell's staff, was recruited to run as an independent by N.C. Families First, but said in June 2010 that he would not run.

Kissell raised $1,104,141 and spent $1,105,922. Johnson raised $1,079,623 and spent $1,066,424. Cornelison raised $20,531 and spent the same amount. D'Annunzio raised $1,595,547 and spent the same amount. Day raised $25,790 and spent the same amount. Huddleston raised $215,115 and spent $214,555. Jordan raised $210,068 and spent the same amount.

In a poll of 744 voters conducted by Public Policy Polling (PPP) in January 2010, Kissell led with 53 percent to Johnson's 39 percent while 8 percent were undecided. A PPP poll of 400 voters, conducted in June 2010, found Kissell leading with 41 percent to Johnson's 35 percent in a two-way race, while 23 percent were undecided; and with 40 percent to Johnson's 30 percent and Fant's 14 percent in a three-way contest, while 16 percent remained undecided. A poll conducted for Kissell's campaign by Anzalone Liszt Research between August 19 and 24, 2010, with a sample of 500 likely voters, found Kissell leading with 49 percent to Johnson's 32 percent and Hill's 7 percent, while 12 percent were undecided. In a poll of 400 likely voters, conducted by Greenberg Quinlan Rosner Research for the Democratic Congressional Campaign Committee between August 25 and 29, 2010, Kissell led with 48 percent to Johnson's 36 percent while 6 percent supported Hill. A poll of 400 likely voters, conducted by Public Opinion Strategies for Johnson's campaign on August 29 and 30, 2010, found Kissell had the support of 39 percent while 34 percent favored Johnson and 27 percent either were undecided or supported Hill. In a poll of 450 registered voters, conducted by SurveyUSA for the Civitas Institute in October 2010, Kissell led with 46 percent to Johnson's 45 percent while 9 percent were undecided.

In October 2010 The Cook Political Report rated the race as a "toss up" and CQ Politics rated the race as a "tossup" while Sabato's Crystal Ball rated the race as "Leans Republican". In November 2010 The Rothenberg Political Report rated the race as "Lean Democrat". Prior to the election ''FiveThirtyEights forecast gave Johnson a 53 percent chance of winning and projected that he would receive 49.0 percent of the vote to Kissell's 48.5 percent. On election day Kissell was re-elected with 53 percent of the vote to Johnson's 44 percent. Kissell unsuccessfully sought re-election in 2012 and was succeeded by Republican Richard Hudson.

Democratic primary results

 
 
 
 

Republican primary results

 
 
 
 
 
 
 
 

Republican primary runoff results

 
 
 
 

General election results

 
 
 
 
 
 

External links
 
 
 
 
 
 
 

 District 9 

The 9th district included Huntersville and parts of Charlotte and Gastonia. The district's population was 76 percent white, 13 percent black and 7 percent Hispanic (see Race and ethnicity in the United States Census); 90 percent were high school graduates and 40 percent had received a bachelor's degree or higher. Its median income was $64,255. In the 2008 presidential election the district gave 55 percent of its vote to Republican nominee John McCain and 45 percent to Democratic nominee John McCain.

Republican Sue Myrick, who took office in 1995, was the incumbent. Myrick was re-elected in 2008 with 62 percent of the vote. In 2010 Myrick's opponent in the general election was Democratic nominee Jeff Doctor, a small business owner. Myrick and Doctor were unopposed in their respective primaries.

Myrick raised $1,038,833 and spent $997,492. Doctor raised $110,132 and spent $109,413. Prior to the election FiveThirtyEights forecast gave Myrick a 100 percent chance of winning and projected that she would receive 67 percent of the vote to Doctor's 31 percent. On election day Myrick was re-elected with 69 percent of the vote to Doctor's 31 percent. Myrick retired rather than seeking re-election in 2012 and was succeeded by fellow Republican Robert Pittenger.

General election results

 
 
 
 

External links
 
 

 District 10 

The 10th district included Hickory, Shelby and part of Mooresville. The district's population was 83 percent white, 9 percent black and 5 percent Hispanic (see Race and ethnicity in the United States Census); 78 percent were high school graduates and 17 percent had received a bachelor's degree or higher. Its median income was $42,241. In the 2008 presidential election the district gave 63 percent of its vote to Republican nominee John McCain and 36 percent to Democratic nominee Barack Obama.

Republican Patrick McHenry, who took office in 2005, was the incumbent. McHenry was re-elected with 58 percent of the vote in 2008. In 2010 McHenry's opponent in the general election was Democratic nominee Jeff Gregory, a retired postmaster. David Michael Boldon; Scott Keadle, an Iredell County Commissioner and dentist; and Vance Patterson, a businessman and vice-chair of the Burke County Republican Party, also sought the Republican nomination. Anne Fischer, who was the Democratic nominee in the 10th district in 2004, also sought the Democratic nomination.

McHenry raised $1,015,155 and spent $886,897. Keadle raised $75,680 and spent $75,645. Patterson raised $283,476 and spent $284,788.

Prior to the election FiveThirtyEights forecast gave McHenry a 100 percent chance of winning and projected that he would receive 66 percent of the vote to Gregory's 32 percent. On election day McHenry was re-elected with 71 percent of the vote to Gregory's 29 percent. McHenry was re-elected in 2012 and 2014. Patterson unsuccessfully sought the Republican nomination in the 11th district in 2012.

Republican primary results

 
 
 
 
 
 

Democratic primary results

 
 
 
 

General election results

 
 
 
 

External links
 
 
 
 
 

 District 11 

The 11th district included Asheville and Hendersonville. The district's population was 88 percent white, 5 percent black and 4 percent Hispanic (see Race and ethnicity in the United States Census); 84 percent were high school graduates and 25 percent had received a bachelor's degree or higher. Its median income was $41,403. In the 2008 presidential election the district gave 52 percent of its vote to Republican nominee John McCain and 47 percent to Democratic nominee Barack Obama. In 2010 the district had a Cook Partisan Voting Index of R+6.

Democrat Heath Shuler, who took office in 2007, was the incumbent. Shuler was re-elected in 2008 with 62 percent of the vote. In 2010 Shuler's opponent in the general election was Republican nominee Jeff Miller, a businessman. Aixa Wilson, an employee of an archeology firm, also sought the Democratic nomination. Dan Eichenbaum, an ophthalmologist; Jake Howard, a retiree; Ed Krause, an attorney; Greg Newman, the former mayor of Hendersonville; and Kenny West, an insurance agent, also sought the Republican nomination.

Shuler raised $1,347,011 and spent $2,212,737. Miller raised $795,054 and spent $782,645. Eichenbaum raised $140,423 and spent $136,521. Newman raised $44,195 and spent the same amount.

In a poll of 300 likely voters, conducted by Public Opinion Strategies for Miller's campaign in June 2010, Shuler led with 46 percent to Miller's 34 percent while 18 percent were undecided. A poll of 500 likely voters, conducted by Anzalone Liszt Research for Shuler's campaign between July 8 and 13, 2010, found Shuler leading with 51 percent to Miller's 34 percent while 15 percent remained undecided; while a poll of 400 registered voters conducted later in July by the Civitas Institute found Shuler leasing with 45 percent to Miller's 44 percent. In a poll of 413 likely voters, conducted by Greenberg Quinlan Rosner Research (GQRR) for the Democratic Congressional Campaign Committee (DCCC) between 4 and 6, 2010, Shuler led with 54 percent to Miller's 41 percent; another GQRR poll, conducted for the DCCC between October 17 and 19, 2010, found Shuler leading with 54 percent to Miller's 39 percent.Sabato's Crystal Ball rated the race as "Likely Democratic", citing Shuler's decisive 2008 victory. In October 2010 The Cook Political Report rated the race as "lean Democratic" and CQ Politics rated the race as "likely Democratic". In November 2010 The Rothenberg Political Report rated the race as "Democrat Favored". Prior to the election FiveThirtyEights forecast gave Shuler an 84 percent chance of winning and projected that he would receive 54 percent of the vote to Miller's 46 percent.

On election day Shuler was re-elected with 54 percent of the vote to Miller's 46 percent. Shuler retired rather than seeking re-election in 2012. After redistricting the former 11th district was represented by Republicans Patrick McHenry and Mark Meadows.

Democratic primary results

 
 
 
 

Republican primary results

 
 
 
 
 
 
 
 

General election results

 
 
 
 

External links
 
 
 
 
 
 
 

 District 12 

The 12th district included parts of Charlotte, Greensboro, High Point, Salisbury and Winston-Salem. The district's population was 44 percent black, 41 percent white and 11 percent Hispanic (see Race and ethnicity in the United States Census); 80 percent were high school graduates and 22 percent had received a bachelor's degree or higher. Its median income was $40,075. In the 2008 presidential election the district gave 71 percent of its vote to Democratic nominee Barack Obama and 29 percent to Republican nominee John McCain.

Democrat Mel Watt, who took office in 1993, was the incumbent. Watt was re-elected in 2008 with 72 percent of the vote. In 2010 Watt's opponent in the general election was Republican nominee Greg Dority, a partner in a security firm. Libertarian Party nominee Lon Cecil, an electronics engineer, also ran. Watt was unopposed for the Democratic nomination. Scott Cumbie, who worked in the computer industry; and William "Doc" Gillenwater, a retiree, also sought the Republican nomination.

Watt raised $604,719 and spent $591,204. Cecil raised $13,041 and spent $12,996. Prior to the election FiveThirtyEight'''s forecast gave Watt a 100 percent chance of winning and projected that he would receive 67 percent of the vote to Dority's 30 percent. On election day Watt was re-elected with 64 percent of the vote to Dority's 34 percent. Watt was again re-elected in 2012. In 2013 Watt was confirmed as director of the Federal Housing Finance Agency; he was succeeded by fellow Democrat Alma Adams.

Republican primary results

 
 
 
 
 

Republican primary runoff results

 
 
 
 

General election results

 
 
 
 
 

External links
 
 
 
 

 District 13 

The 13th district included parts of Greensboro, Raleigh and Wake Forest. The district's population was 59 percent white, 28 percent black and 9 percent Hispanic (see Race and ethnicity in the United States Census); 84 percent were high school graduates and 30 percent had received a bachelor's degree or higher. Its median income was $46,900. In the 2008 presidential election the district gave 59 percent of its vote to Democratic nominee Barack Obama and 40 percent to Republican nominee John McCain.

Democrat Brad Miller, who took office in 2003, was the incumbent. Miller was re-elected in 2008 with 66 percent of the vote. In 2010 Miller's opponent in the general election was Republican nominee Bill Randall, a U.S. Navy retiree. Miller was unopposed in the Democratic primary. Dan Huffman, an engineer and business owner; Frank Hurley, a retired aerospace engineer; and Bernie Reeves, a magazine publisher, also sought the Republican nomination.

Miller raised $930,351 and spent $899,442. Randall raised $200,449 and spent $198,055. Huffman raised $42,257 and spent the same amount. Reeves raised $277,361 and spent $275,366.

Prior to the election FiveThirtyEights forecast gave Miller a 99 percent chance of winning and projected that he would receive 60 percent of the vote. On election day Miller was re-elected with 55 percent of the vote to Randall's 45 percent. Miller retired rather than seeking re-election in 2012 and was succeeded by Republican George Holding.

Republican primary results

Republican primary runoff results

General election results

External links

See also
 List of United States representatives from North Carolina
 United States congressional delegations from North Carolina

References

North Carolina
2010
United States House of Representatives